La Leyenda Negra is a 2020 American coming-of-age drama that premiered at the Sundance Festival's NEXT program. It was released on December 4, 2020 on HBO. It runs 1 hour 24 minutes. The film is about an undocumented teenager who fights for her right to stay in the United States in Compton, while risking her family, her friends, and her first love. It was written and directed by Patricia Vidal Delgado, and produced by Alicia Herder and Marcel Perez.

Cast  
 Monica Betancourt as Aleteia
 Kailei Lopez as Rosarito
 Irlanda Moreno as Monica
 Juan Reynoso as Aleteia's Stepfather
 Sammy Flores as David
 Justin Avila as Armando

Critical reception 
La Leyenda Negra has received mixed reviews. It is rated  on Rotten Tomatoes. It has been praised for the way it was shot and the potent energy contained within it, while it also has been criticized for juggling too much subject matter. The film's title is a reference to The Black Legend, a pervasive anti-Latino bias.

References

External links 
 

American coming-of-age drama films
2020 films
2020 drama films
2020s coming-of-age drama films
2020s American films